Chimaltitán Municipality is a municipality in the north of the state of Jalisco, Mexico.

Borders
It is bordered on the north by Totatiche Municipality and Villa Guerrero Municipality, to the east by the state of Zacatecas, to the south by San Martín de Bolaños Municipality and to the west by Bolaños Municipality.

Municipalities of Jalisco